The Wise Little Hen is a 1934 Walt Disney's Silly Symphony cartoon, based on the fable The Little Red Hen. The cartoon features the debut of Donald Duck, dancing to the Sailor's Hornpipe. Donald and his friend Peter Pig try to avoid work by faking stomach aches until Mrs. Hen teaches them the value of labor. Though distributor United Artists gave June 9, 1934 as the cartoon's release date, it was actually first shown on May 3, 1934 at the Carthay Circle Theatre in Los Angeles for a benefit program, while it was later given its official debut on June 7 at the Radio City Music Hall in New York City. It was animated by Art Babbitt, Dick Huemer, Clyde Geronimi, Louie Schmitt, and Frenchy de Tremaudan (with assistance from a group of junior animators headed by Ben Sharpsteen) and directed by Wilfred Jackson. The story was also adapted in the Silly Symphony Sunday comic strip by Ted Osborne and Al Taliaferro, which was Donald Duck's first appearance in Disney comics.

Plot
The Wise Little Hen of the title is looking for someone to help her plant her corn for the winter. Peter Pig and Donald Duck both feign belly aches to get out of the chore, since they would rather play than work. So, with help from her chicks, she plants it herself. Harvest time comes; again, Peter and Donald claim belly aches, but the hen sees through this when boards of their clubhouse fall off showing their little act when they shake hands with each other for evading responsibility. Upon wising up to their ruse, she and her chicks wink at each other upon knowing what to do with Peter and Donald later. She cooks up a tantalizing assortment of corn dishes, and heads over to Peter and Donald to help her eat them, but before she can open her mouth, they already fake their belly aches. Once she asks them to help her eat the corn, they snap out of their façade and are excited to eat, but all she gives them is castor oil. As the hen and her chicks eat the corn themselves, Peter and Donald repent with all their might by kicking each other in the rump.

Cast
Florence Gill - The Wise Little Hen
Clarence Nash - Donald Duck, Peter Pig
Pinto Colvig - Peter Pig (moaning noises)

Adaptations
The Silly Symphony Sunday comic strip ran a three-month-long adaptation of The Wise Little Hen from September 16 to December 16, 1934.

The 1962 storybook Walt Disney's Story Land: 55 Favorite Stories featured an adaptation of the cartoon called "Mrs. Cackle's Corn". In this version, Clara Cluck is telling the story. By 1962, Donald Duck was thought unsuitable for a bit part in a fairy tale, so they use Daniel Duck instead. Patsy Pig was substituted for Peter Pig.

Home media
The short has been released several times on home media. The first release was in 1986 on Betamax on Donald Duck Volume 1. It was released in 1989 on VHS, Beta, and Laserdisc on Mickey Mouse & Donald Duck Volume 2. It was re-released on those same three formats in 1991 on Donald Duck's 50th Birthday.

It was released on December 4, 2001 on Walt Disney Treasures: Silly Symphonies - The Historic Musical Animated Classics, and on May 18, 2004 on Walt Disney Treasures: The Chronological Donald, Volume One: 1934-1941.

References

External links
The Wise Little Hen on The Encyclopedia of Disney Animated Shorts

1930s color films
1930s Disney animated short films
Donald Duck short films
Fictional chickens
Films adapted into comics
Films based on fables
Films directed by Wilfred Jackson
Films produced by Walt Disney
Films scored by Leigh Harline
Silly Symphonies
1934 films
1934 short films
1934 animated films
1930s American films
Animated films about chickens
Animated films about pigs